Charles Bernard Beard  was Dean of  Glasgow and Galloway from 1937 to 1943.

He was  born on 7 December 1870, educated at  the University of Glasgow;and ordained deacon in 1895,  and priest in 1896. After curacies in Dundee and Glasgow he was Rector of Peterhead from 1902 until 1905;  and of Helensburgh from 1905 until his death on 11 February 1943.

References

Alumni of the University of Glasgow
Deans of Glasgow and Galloway
1870 births
1943 deaths